Sascha Bert (born 5 March 1975 in Darmstadt, Germany) is a German racing driver.

References

1975 births
Living people
German racing drivers
International Formula 3000 drivers
International GT Open drivers
ADAC GT Masters drivers
Sportspeople from Darmstadt
Racing drivers from Hesse

Opel Team BSR drivers
21st-century German people
Nordic Racing drivers
Nürburgring 24 Hours drivers